Dusty Miller may refer to:

People
 Dusty Miller (1890s outfielder) (1868–1945), American professional baseball player primarily with the Cincinnati Reds
 Dusty Miller (1900s outfielder) (1876–1950), American professional baseball player with the Chicago Cubs
 Dusty Miller (mayor) (1929–2012), Canadian politician, mayor of Thunder Bay, Ontario
 Dusty Miller (martyr) (died 1945), British P.O.W. during the Second World War, crucified by a Japanese guard because of his faith
 Graham Miller (RAF officer) (born 1951), retired senior Royal Air Force officer

Plants
 Artemisia stelleriana, an Asian and North American species of plants in the sunflower family
 Centaurea cineraria, a small plant in the family Asteraceae native to the Island of Capraia
 Jacobaea maritima,  a perennial plant species in the genus Jacobaea native to the Mediterranean region
 Lychnis coronaria, a species of flowering plant in the family Caryophyllaceae native to Asia and Europe
 Spyridium parvifolium, a shrub in the family Rhamnaceae, endemic to Australia